Ženski nogometni klub Radomlje, commonly referred to as ŽNK Radomlje or simply Radomlje, is a Slovenian women's football club from the city of Radomlje, currently playing in the 1. SŽNL, the top division of Slovenian women's football.

Current squad

See also
NK Radomlje, men's team

References

External links
Official website 

Association football clubs established in 2012
Women's football clubs in Slovenia
2012 establishments in Slovenia